Melittia chlorophila is a moth of the family Sesiidae. It was described by Erich Martin Hering in 1935 and is known from Sierra Leone.

References

Sesiidae
Moths of Africa